Saint Nicholas was a 4th-century saint and Greek Bishop of Myra.

Saint Nicholas or Saint Nick may also refer to:

Santa Claus or Saint Nicholas, a western folk legend inspired by the saint
Sinterklaas or Sint-Nicolaas, the Dutch variant of the folk legend
Saint Nicholas, a gift-bringing figure in Europe
Saint Nicholas Day, the feast day of the saint

Other saints
Nicholas of Sion (d. 564) early Christian saint
Pope Nicholas I or Saint Nicholas the Great (c. 800–868)
Saint Nicholas of Tolentino (c.1246–1303), Italian saint and mystic
Saint Nicholas Kabasilas (c.1322–1392), Byzantine mystic and theological writer
Saint Nicholas of Flüe (1417–1487), Swiss hermit and ascetic
Saint Nicholas Pieck (1534–1572), Dutch saint and martyr
Saint Nicholas Owen (martyr) (c.1550–1606), English Catholic martyr
Saint Nicholas of Japan (1836–1912), introduced Eastern Orthodox Church to Japan
Nicholas II of Russia or Saint Nicholas the Passion-Bearer (1868–1918), last emperor of Russia
Saint Niels of Aarhus (before 1157–1180), Danish saint and prince

Places
Saint Nicholas Peak (Canada), Alberta and British Columbia, Canada
St. Nicholas, Prince Edward Island, Canada
St. Nicholas, (civil parish, County Galway), a civil parish in the barony of Galway, County Galway, Ireland
St. Nicholas, (civil parish, County Wexford), a civil parish in the barony of Ballaghkeen South, County Wexford, Ireland
St. Nicholas, Vale of Glamorgan, Wales
St. Nicholas, Jacksonville, Florida, United States
Mount Saint Nicholas, Montana, United States
Saint Nicholas Avenue (Manhattan), New York City, United States
St. Nicholas Cove, Coronation Island, Antarctica
St. Nicholas's Island, a former name of Drake's Island, Plymouth Sound, England

Other uses
 Saint Nicolas, a 1948 cantata with music by Benjamin Britten and text by Eric Crozier
 St. Nicholas Centre, a shopping centre in Aberdeen, Scotland, now part of the Bon Accord Centre
 St. Nicholas, a children's magazine published in the United States (1873–1943)
 Botik of Peter the Great or Saint Nichols, a miniature warship
 Sint or Saint Nick, a 2010 Dutch comedy horror film

See also

St. Nicholas Church (disambiguation), includes pages without "Church" in their names
Saint Nicholas Monastery (disambiguation)
Saint Nicolas (disambiguation)
San Nicola (disambiguation)
San Nicolás (disambiguation)
São Nicolau (disambiguation)
Sveti Nikola (disambiguation)
Agios Nikolaos (disambiguation)
 
 
 Nicholas (disambiguation)
 Saint (disambiguation)